Laprade or La Prade may refer to:

Places
 Laprade, Aude, France
 Laprade, Charente, France
 LaPrade Valley, Columbus Hills, Antarctica

People
 Albert Laprade (1883–1978), French architect
 Edgar Laprade (1919–2014), Canadian professional ice hockey centre
 Émile Pinet-Laprade (1822–1869), governor of Senegal
 Erik La Prade (fl. 1978–2018), U.S. journalist
 Robert F. LaPrade (fl. 1981–2013), U.S. surgeon
 Robert M. La Prade (born 1916), U.S. soldier
 Serge Laprade (born 1941), French Canadian singer and a radio and television host 
 Victor de Laprade (1812–1883), French poet and critic

Other uses
 USS La Prade, a U.S. World War II destroyer

See also
 Prade, a settlement in the Littoral region of Slovenia
 Prades (disambiguation)
 Saint-Germain-Laprade, Haute-Loire, France